"Kushi" (Khushī) is the first single released by Bombay Rockers from their second album Crash And Burn. It was released in 2006. Kushi was a hit track that sold over a million copies in India and Denmark.

Track listing
 "Kushi" (Radio Edit)
 "Kushi" (Album Version)
 "Kushi" (Instrumental)
 "Kushi" (Acapella)

Bombay Rockers songs
2006 singles
2006 songs